This is a list of Italian television related events from 1999.

Events
3 July - Debut of Momenti di gloria, a series hosted by Mike Bongiorno in which members of the public impersonate their favourite singers.

Debuts

Rai

Miniseries 

 Commesse (Salesgirls) – by Giorgio Capitani and Josè Maria Sanchez, with Nancy Brilli, Sabrina Ferilli, Veronica Pivetti and Anna Valle; 2 seasons. Comedy drama about family and work troubles of some salesgirls in a Roman boutique.

Serials 

 Inspector Montalbano by Alberto Sironi, with Luca Zingaretti in the title role, Cesare Bocci, Angelo Russo and Katharina Bohm, from the Andrea Camilleri’s novels; 15 seasons. Procedural set in the imaginary Sicilian town Vigata, it’s the greatest public and critic success of the latest Italian fiction and one of the few Italian serials exported abroad.
 Non lasciamoci più (Let’s never break-up again) – romantic comedy by Vittorio Sindoni, with Fabrizio Frizzi (in his only performance as an actor) and Debora Caprioglio; 2 seasons. A marriage lawyer, confirmed bachelor, avoids several useless divorces, till he's embedded by his helper, a charming female private eye.

News and educational 

 Correva l’anno (It was the year...) – historical magazine, care of Paolo Mieli.

For children 

 Teletubbies (RaiSat Ragazzi) (1997-2001, 2015–present)
 The Angry Beavers (Rai 2) (1997-2001)

Fininvest

Serials 

 Finalmente soli (Alone, at least) – sit-com with Gerry Scotti and Maria Amelia Monti, spin-off of Io e la mamma; 5 seasons and 3 TV-movies. A dentist, who has lived with his mother up to forty, faces for the first time marriage and fatherhood.

Variety
3 July - Momenti di gloria (1999-2000)
Chi ha incastrato Peter Pan? (Who framed Peter Pan?) – game show and variety with contenders from four to ten years old, hosted by Paolo Bonolis and Luca Laurenti; 6 seasons. (The 2005 edition, hosted by Gerry Scotti, has been called Who framed Uncle Gerry?) Italian version of the Spanish Esos locos bajitos.

For children
September - / Pocket Dragon Adventures (Italia 1) (1998-1999)

Television shows

RAI

Drama 

 Pinocchio ovvero lo spettacolo della Provvidenza (Pinocchio, or The Providence’s show) – parody of the Collodi’s novel, directed and interpreted by Carmelo Bene.
 Esther – by Raffaele Mertes, with Louise Lombard in the title role and F. Murray Abraham as Mordecai; tenth episode of the LUX Vide’s Bible project.
 Jesus – by Roger Young, with Jeremy Sisto in the title role, Jacqueline Bisset as Mary, Debra Messing as Mary Magdalene and Gary Oldman as Pontius Pilate; 2 episodes.  Eleventh episode of the LUX Vide’s Bible project.

Miniseries 

 Come stanno bene insieme (How well they fit together) – by Vittorio Sindoni, with Sergio Castellitto and Stefania Sandrelli; 3 episodes. It’s the story of thirty years in the life of a couple, from the falling in love and the marriage to the separation and the reconciliation.

For children 

 Jolanda, la figlia del corsaro nero (Yolanda, the black corsair’s daughter) – animated series from the Emilio Salgari’s novel, coproduced with Spain.

Ending this year

Births

Deaths

References